Inger Bråtveit (born 3 October 1978) is a Norwegian novelist and children's writer.

Bråtveit was born in Bergen, and grew up in Suldal. She made her literary debut in 2001 with the novel Munn mot ein frosen fjord. For this novel she was awarded the Nynorsk Literature Prize in 2002. Her second novel was Siss og Unn from 2008, where the central characters are taken from Tarjei Vesaas' novel The Ice Palace. The poetry collection Loveprosjekt from 2009 was a collaboration with the Swedish poet Cecilia Hansson. Her first children's book is Kven er snillast av mor og far? from 2012. She was awarded Bjørnsonstipendet in 2009, and Suldal Mållags Målpris in 2010.

References

1978 births
Living people
Writers from Bergen
People from Suldal
21st-century Norwegian novelists
Norwegian children's writers
21st-century Norwegian poets
Norwegian women poets
Norwegian women novelists
Norwegian women children's writers
21st-century Norwegian women writers